The Trinity College Beenleigh is an independent Roman Catholic co-educational secondary day school, located in , Queensland, Australia.

History 

Founded in 1982 by the Marist Brothers, it is near Saint Joseph's Tobruk Memorial School and convent which were opened in October 1953.  In comparison, Beenleigh State High School was opened in 1963. Saint Patrick's Catholic Church is in an adjoining street.

Notable alumni

 Michael Voss, AFL player, attended the school in the late 1980s.
 Jordan Membrey. AFLW player, attended the school in the 2010s.

References

External links

Trinity College Beenleigh website

Schools in South East Queensland
Catholic secondary schools in Queensland
Association of Marist Schools of Australia
Educational institutions established in 1982
1982 establishments in Australia
Beenleigh, Queensland